Crucea is a commune located in Suceava County, Romania. It is composed of four villages: Chiril, Cojoci, Crucea and Satu Mare.

References

Communes in Suceava County
Localities in Western Moldavia
Mining communities in Romania